Treaty of Casco may refer to:

Treaty of Casco (1678)
Treaty of Casco (1703)